Stephen Marc Matthews (born July 1, 1953) is an Australian children's author and adult novelist. His children's books have been published in Australia, United States, Canada and the UK. 

Matthews was educated in the UK, where he worked in the finance and banking industries. Upon migrating to Australia, he purchased a share in an industrial business in Western Sydney.

At age 55 Matthews retired from business to become a writer. Matthews then suffered an unexpected debilitating spinal problem, resulting in a series of operations and procedures. It was not until he reached 61, that Matthews finally commenced his writing career. 

Matthew's children's books have been published in Australia, the UK, United States and Canada.  His work in children literacy at home and abroad (India and South Africa) has been acknowledged in the Australian State Parliament.

Matthews’ first novel for adults, The Skinny Girl, was released in November 2018. Dealing with the difficult subject of domestic abuse, the story is based upon true events. Matthews’ second novel for adults, Hitler's Brothel, released October 5, 2020 looks at German concentration camps in World War II.

Works
 The Skinny Girl
 Hitler's Brothel
 Hitler's Assassins
 The Psycho Scientist
 Lord Grott of Grott Hall
 Brain in a Box 
 Slugs' Revenge 
 Charming

References

http://www.stevematthewsauthor.com

1953 births
Living people
Australian children's writers